Kamran may refer to:
Kamran-e Beyg Reza
Kamran-e Rahman